Schools of Opportunity is a project that aims to recognize public high schools that minimize opportunity gaps with outstanding education. The National Education Policy Center, a non-profit education policy research center, created Schools of Opportunity as a project in 2014.

Mission 
The Schools of Opportunity project gives annual "gold" and "silver" recognition to schools in the United States. The project seeks to recognize those high schools that follow practices such as supporting students' physical and psychological health, having outreach to the community, and having a broad, enriched curriculum. It is built on criteria set forth in the 2013 book, Closing the Opportunity Gap.

The Schools of Opportunity project believes that high quality schools are those that use research-based practices, and that standardized testing mainly reflects the student's learning opportunities outside of school; therefore, the project does not focus on how effective the school is. That is, the project illustrates an alternative to ranking systems based on test score, which overwhelmingly reward schools that serve wealthy or cherry-picked student bodies. Schools submit initial applications explaining and documenting why they should be recognized with a reward. Then, after two online reviews and one school visit, the gold and silver recognitions are announced. In order to qualify for recognition, the school must be a public or charter school; it must enroll high school students; at least 10% of the school must qualify for free or reduced priced lunch; the percentage of students with Individualized Education Programs must not fall 2 or more points below the district where the school is located; the school must commit to ensuring all students have access to rich, challenging but supported learning opportunities; and it must be committed to non-exclusionary discipline practices. While designated Schools of Opportunity do not receive extra funding, the directors of the project hope for them to serve as role models for other peers.

Origins
Schools of Opportunity was founded in 2014 in New York and Colorado by the National Education Policy Center and expanded across the United States in 2015. The project has been funded by, among others, the Ford Foundation, the NEA Foundation, and Voqal.

List of Recipients

References

External links 
The Schools of Opportunity website

American education awards
University of Colorado Boulder